Gunnar Eilifsen (12 September 1897 – 16 August 1943) was a Norwegian police officer.

In 1943, during the Nazi occupation of Norway, he was executed for disobedience when he refused to arrest five girls who did not show up for forced labour.  A retroactive law was hurriedly passed after his execution and that law was subsequently referred to as Lex Eilifsen. Quisling was convicted for his murder.

References

1897 births
1943 deaths
People from Kristiansand
Norwegian police officers
Executed Norwegian people

Norwegian resistance members
Norwegian people executed by Nazi Germany